The Minus Eighty-Degree Laboratory Freezer for ISS (MELFI) is a European-built experiment storage freezer for the International Space Station. It comprises four independent dewars which can be set to operate at different temperatures. Currently temperatures of −80 °C, −26 °C, and +4 °C are used during on-orbit ISS operations. Both reagents and samples will be stored in the freezer. As well as storage the freezer is designed to be used to transport samples to and from the ISS in a temperature controlled environment. The total capacity of the unit is 300 litres.

History
The first MELFI unit, FU-1, was flown to the station in 2006 on Space Shuttle mission STS-121, installed in the Destiny Laboratory Module, and commissioned by Thomas Reiter.

The MELFI flight units were originally designed to be flown fully powered in the Multi-Purpose Logistics Module, permitting pre-made experiments to be flown to the station without contaminating or destroying any samples.

The plan was to cycle the three MELFI units between orbit and Earth.

The final MELFI unit was flown to the ISS on board Space Shuttle Discovery during the STS-131 mission in 2010.

MELFI description
Each dewar is a cylindrical vacuum-insulated 75 litre container and can accommodate samples of a variety of sizes and shapes.  The initial delivery of the unit also included a number of spare dewars.

MELFI was developed by the European Space Agency. Two units have been supplied to NASA and one to the Japan Aerospace Exploration Agency (JAXA).  In addition ground units for training, experiment preparation, and use in control experiments have been built.

Weight: 730 kg (1609 pounds)
Design lifetime: 10 years.

Additional cold storage 

Additional cold storage and transportation options available are listed below:
MERLIN (Microgravity Experiment Research Locker/ Incubator)
 +48 °C to -20 °C
GLACIER (General Laboratory Active Cryogenic ISS Experiment Refrigerator)
 +4 °C to –160 °C
Polar (Research Refrigerator for ISS) 
(+4 °C to -95 °C)

See also
Scientific research on the ISS
International Standard Payload Rack
International Space Station
STS-121

Gallery

References

External links
 Minus Eighty-Degree Laboratory Freezer for ISS (MELFI) - NASA
 The Minus Eightys Degree Celsius Laboratory Freezer for the International Space Station (MELFI) - JAXA
 NASA Feature Story - Loading Leonardo
 The ESA Laboratory Support Equipment for the ISS - ESA

Science facilities on the International Space Station
Destiny (ISS module)
Kibo (ISS module)